Yousef Majid (born 8 September 2003) is an English cricketer who plays for Surrey County Cricket Club. He is a left handed batsman and slow left arm orthodox bowler.

Early life
Majid attended Cranleigh School and was part of the 2022 Academy intake at Surrey. He made his Second XI debut in 2021. He has also played for Chesham Cricket Club.

Career
He was awarded a short term professional contract in the summer of 2022, this came after he took 10 wickets in two Second XI Championship games which included a second innings 6-54 at Radlett against Middlesex. Majid made his List A debut on 2 August, 2022 in the Royal London One-Day Cup against Leicestershire at Guilford. He took a wicket with his fifth ball on debut.

International career
On 25 August, 2022 Majid was called uo to the England under-19 cricket team for the test series against Sri Lanka under-19s.

References

External Links

Living people
2003 births
English cricketers
Surrey cricketers
People educated at Cranleigh School
Sportspeople from Slough